William Helmreich (August 25, 1945 – March 28, 2020) was a Swiss-born American professor of sociology at the City College of New York Colin Powell School for Civic and Global Leadership and the Graduate Center of the City University of New York. He was also a published author.

Helmreich was a distinguished professor at the City University of New York, who specialized in race and ethnic relations, religion, immigration, risk behavior, the sociology of New York City, urban sociology, consumer behavior, and market research.

Early life
Helmreich was born in 1945 in Zürich, Switzerland, the son of Holocaust survivor parents. In 1946, he was brought to the US as an infant, and grew up in New York City on Manhattan’s Upper West Side.
He studied in the Ner Yisroel and Kamenitz Yeshivas.

Career
Helmreich wrote about his early years in a book he named "Wake Up, Wake Up, to Do the Work of the Creator" (a phrase, spoken in Yiddish, by those who went house-to-house to awaken worshippers for daily prayer).

When asked about recordings of "many of the famous roshei Yeshiva of yesteryear" whom he interviewed, "Do you still have the recordings?" he replied "At one time I thought I did, but it seems that all I have are the transcripts." These he donated to his alma mater, Yeshiva University.

Works
 The Black Crusaders (1973)
 The things they say behind your back (1982)
 The World of the Yeshiva (1982)
 Flight Path (1989)
 Against All Odds (1992)
 The Enduring Community (1998)
 What Was I Thinking (2010)
 The New York Nobody Knows (2013)
 The Brooklyn Nobody Knows (2016)
 The Manhattan Nobody Knows (2018)

The World of the Yeshiva
Helmreich revised his 1982 The World of the Yeshiva 18 years later by comparing sociological changes "among the strictly Orthodox" since his 1980 research. Two areas about the new edition highlighted by The New York Times are the doubling in those doing full-time "collegiate and graduate"-level religious studies and population growth.

Death
Helmreich died March 28, 2020 at age 74 of COVID-19 in Great Neck, New York.

References

1945 births
2020 deaths
20th-century American male writers
20th-century American non-fiction writers
21st-century American male writers
21st-century American non-fiction writers
American male non-fiction writers
American sociologists
Jewish American writers
Graduate Center, CUNY faculty
Yeshiva University alumni
Scientists from Zürich
Swiss emigrants to the United States